Gilberto Ribeiro Gonçalves (born 13 September 1980 in Andradina), commonly known as Gil  is a Brazilian former footballer who played as a forward. He was formally a Brazilian international.

Club career

Early years
Gil grew up in a small town, Andradina, where his talent was recognised at a very early age. He was noticed by Corinthians scouts at the age 15, and soon went on to join as a youth player.

Corinthians
His time at Corinthians was relatively successful, with Gil managing to register 31 goals in 124 games, a decent record for a winger. His pace, skill, technical ability, control and ability to beat his man shone in the Brazilian league, but after five years with the Corinthians first team, he transferred to Tokyo Verdy 1969 of Japan, in 2005.

Tokyo Verdy
His time in Japan was very unsuccessful, with Gil not being a regular starter and not playing to his full potential, which in turn led him to be sold to Brazilian team Cruzeiro, in 2006.

Cruzeiro
He did not present his best football while in Cruzeiro. Only scoring four goals in over fifteen appearances. He did however start in the majority of the games and became a reliable source for assisting other players for goals.

Gimnàstic de Tarragona
His season long stay in Tarragona was yet another unsuccessful venture for Gil. Gil played 19 matches and he did not score any goals, during his time with Gimnàstic de Tarragona.

Flamengo
On 25 September 2009 Flamengo have signed the forward until December 2009.

International career
Gil appeared for the Brazil national football team in the 2003 FIFA Confederations Cup.

Career statistics

Club

International

Honours

Club
São Paulo's Cup (U 20): 1999
São Paulo State League: 1999, 2001, 2003
Tournament Rio – São Paulo: 2002
Brazilian Cup: 2002
Minas Gerais State League: 2006
Brazilian Série A: 2009

Individual honours
Brazilian Bola de Prata (Placar): 2002

Meme[edit] 
Gil became famous in Brazil for an interview in 2006 following Cruzeiro, his club at the time, winning the Campeonato Mineiro title. He was asked by Amaral Júnior, a reporter for catholic radio station Rádio Divinópolis, if there were limits to supporters celebrating the title with players, since supporters had invaded the pitch and tore the shirts of some players while celebrating. Live on radio, Gil responded "Só não vale dar o cu, o resto vale tudo" which has homossexual connotation.

References

External links

 
 CBF 
 globoesporte.com 

Living people
1980 births
Brazilian footballers
Brazilian expatriate footballers
Campeonato Brasileiro Série A players
La Liga players
J1 League players
CR Flamengo footballers
Sport Club Internacional players
Sport Club Corinthians Paulista players
Cruzeiro Esporte Clube players
Botafogo de Futebol e Regatas players
Gimnàstic de Tarragona footballers
Tokyo Verdy players
Expatriate footballers in Japan
Expatriate footballers in Spain
Brazil international footballers
2003 FIFA Confederations Cup players
Association football forwards
People from Andradina